Dr. Ashok Kumar (born 27 October 1954) is an Indian politician. His political party is the Indian National Congress. He is the current Working President of the Bihar Pradesh Congress Committee. He is a Member of Legislative Assembly where he represents Rosera (Vidhan Sabha constituency), he has represented the constituency for six terms. Dr. Kumar has an MBBS from Patna Medical College and Hospital.

Political career
Dr. Ashok Kumar entered politics in 1985, when he contested and won from Singhia constituency as an Indian National Congress candidate. In the year 1989, he was appointed Minister of Coal in the Jagannath Mishra led Bihar cabinet, since then he has held several key portfolios including Minister of Institutional Finance, Programme Implementation and Housing. He has also held the post of Congress party whip in the Bihar Legislative Assembly. He was the Leader of the Congress Legislative Party in the Bihar Assembly. He was a member of the Central Election Committee of the All India Congress Committee and a special invitee to the Congress Working Committee.

Also see
List of politicians from Bihar

References

Living people
Indian National Congress politicians
People from Samastipur district
1948 births
Bihar MLAs 1985–1990
Bihar MLAs 1990–1995
Bihar MLAs 1995–2000
Bihar MLAs 2000–2005
Bihar MLAs 2015–2020
Bihari politicians
Indian National Congress politicians from Bihar